The 2003–04 Hong Kong First Division League season was the 92nd since its establishment.

League table

References
 www.rsssf.com Hongkong 2003/04

Hong Kong First Division League, 2003–04
Hong Kong First Division League seasons
First Division